The 2021–22 Liga Națională (known as the Liga Zimbrilor) was the 64th season of the Liga Națională, Romanian premier handball league. It ram from 28 August 2021 to 22 May 2022.

Dinamo București won their eighteenth title.

Teams

Team changes

Arenas and locations
The following 14 clubs compete in the Liga Națională during the 2021–22 season:

League table

Promotion/relegation play-offs
The 11th and 12th-placed teams of the Liga Națională faces the 3rd and 4th-placed team of the Divizia A. The first two places promoted to Liga Națională and the last two relegated to Divizia A. The play-offs were played on neutral ground, in Ghimbav.

See also
 2022 Cupa României
 2021–22 Divizia A

References

External links
Romanian Handball Federaration 

Liga Națională (men's handball)
Romania
Handball
Handball